Budh Ram Singh is an Indian politician and the MLA representing the Budhalada Assembly constituency in the Punjab Legislative Assembly. He is a member of the Aam Aadmi Party.  He was elected as the MLA in the 2017 Punjab Legislative Assembly election and re elected in 2022 Punjab Legislative Assembly election.

Member of Legislative Assembly
He represents the Budhalada Assembly constituency as MLA in Punjab Assembly. The Aam Aadmi Party gained a strong 79% majority in the sixteenth Punjab Legislative Assembly by winning 92 out of 117 seats in the 2022 Punjab Legislative Assembly election. MP Bhagwant Mann was sworn in as Chief Minister on 16 March 2022.

Committee assignments of Punjab Legislative Assembly
Chairman (2022–23) Committee on Public Undertakings

Electoral performance

References

External links
  

Living people
Punjab, India MLAs 2022–2027
Aam Aadmi Party politicians from Punjab, India
Punjab, India MLAs 2017–2022
1957 births